James Brown (October 14, 1828 – April 24, 1897) was a Canadian businessman and politician. He represented Hastings West in the House of Commons of Canada as a Conservative member from 1867 to 1882.

He was born in Scotland in 1828 (1826 in some sources). He was an owner of a company which manufactured iron agricultural implements in Belleville and vice-president of the Belleville and North Hastings Railway. Brown was a lieutenant-colonel in the local militia, served as mayor of Belleville in 1862 and 1863 and was also reeve for Hastings for six years. He ran unsuccessfully for a seat in the assembly for the Province of Canada in 1861. Brown died in Belleville at the age of 68.

References 
City of Belleville History, WC Mikel (1943)

1828 births
1897 deaths
Conservative Party of Canada (1867–1942) MPs
Members of the House of Commons of Canada from Ontario
Mayors of Belleville, Ontario
Scottish emigrants to pre-Confederation Ontario